State Route 11 (SR 11) is a north–south freeway in the northeastern portion of the U.S. state of Ohio. Its southern terminus is at U.S. Route 30 (US 30) in East Liverpool at the West Virginia state line on the Jennings Randolph Bridge over the Ohio River; its northern terminus is at SR 531 in Ashtabula. The route is concurrent with US 30 through East Liverpool and with Interstate 80 (I-80) near Youngstown. The first section of the route to be completed, from Canfield to Austintown, opened in 1969. The entire current route was complete in 1972, and upgraded to a divided highway by 1980.

Route description
The highest traffic count is at I-80 near Austintown, where 38,360 vehicles travel the highway on average each day. The lowest traffic count is near US 6, where 5,550 vehicles travel the highway on average each day.

SR 11 starts at Jennings Randolph Bridge, and becomes concurrent with US 30 and SR 39 as it turns southwest. The concurrency bends around East Liverpool, SR 39 leaves the concurrency, and SR 7 joins it. The route finally turns north and leaves East Liverpool. It turns northwest, near the southern terminus of SR 170. It intersects the concurrency termini of SR 7 and US 30 in these three miles. SR 11 travels through forests, passes by Lisbon, only connecting with SR 154 at an interchange. The highway travels north to near Leetonia, where it meets SR 344 at a diamond interchange. The forests slowly change into farmland, as it passes under SR 14 and into Mahoning County.

In Mahoning County, the route becomes part of the eastern city limits of Canfield, meeting US 224 at a parclo interchange. The highway crosses over the Ohio Turnpike, and becomes concurrent with I-80 few miles later. Here, most of the route is surrounded by urban areas. The interchange with I-80 and I-680 is incomplete, with ramps from I-680 west to I-80 east and I-80 west to I-680 east missing. I-80 and SR 11 travel northeast, leaves Mahoning County, and enters Trumbull County. SR 11 and I-80 split at the interchange at SR 711, east of Girard. This interchange is also incomplete, with ramps from I-80 east to SR 711 south and SR 711 to I-80 west missing.

SR 11 continues north toward Ashtabula, meeting interchanges for SR 82 and an access road to the Youngstown-Warren Regional Airport. Urban areas transition back into rural areas here. It later intersects SR 305 and SR 5 at diamond interchanges near Cortland. The route then enters Ashtabula County, and travels in a straight line, passing through US 322, a rest area, US 6, and SR 307. Mostly forests and fields are between the highway. The route slowly bends northwest, and meets I-90 at a cloverleaf interchange. The route crosses over Ashtabula River, and bypasses Ashtabula. It ends at SR 531, part of the Lake Erie Circle Tour, at a pair of stop signs.

History

SR 11 was designated between 1967–1969 as a connector between Canfield and Austintown. A section from SR 531 to SR 307 was also completed. Those two sections were later connected. By 1972, all parts of the route were complete. SR 11 was upgraded to a limited access highway, from SR 82 to SR 307, between 1972 and 1981. In 2000, construction began for the King Graves Road interchange, which opened a year later. On October 24, 2005, the interchange at SR 711 and I-80/SR 11 opened, after it was modified to connect SR 711. The only rest area on SR 11 received turn lanes in 2011.

SR 11 was designated as the "Lake to River highway" on September 28, 1973. The section in Ashtabula County was also designated as the "Marine Private Henry Kalinowski Memorial Highway" on April 7, 2009. Around 2002, the section in East Liverpool, starting from Newell Street, and ending at the state line, was designated as the "Lou Holtz Freeway".

The original routing of SR 11 in the modern 1923 system went from western Ohio to southeastern Ohio via Dayton and Chillicothe. It was replaced in its entirety by a portion of U.S. Route 35 by 1935, with a concurrency of the routes lasting briefly.

Chemical spills
There have been three chemical spills on SR 11. The first one happened on November 30, 1984. A tanker truck leaked Titanium tetrachloride at the I-80/SR 11 interchange at Girard. About 200 residents who lived near the highway were evacuated. No injuries were reported, and the chemicals were soon contained. A spill was reported on July 7, 1996. A tanker truck spilled methyl alcohol onto SR 11 northbound, in Fairfield Township. The spill was contained, and charges were filed against the driver. The third and most recent one, happened on September 9, 2003. A tanker spilled  of a flammable solvent between SR 344 and SR 154. There were no evacuations.

Exit list

Note that Columbiana County does not have exit numbers on destination signage.

References

External links

011
Freeways in the United States
Transportation in Columbiana County, Ohio
Transportation in Mahoning County, Ohio
Transportation in Trumbull County, Ohio
Transportation in Ashtabula County, Ohio